Belloa eriophora is a plant species native to Chile.

References 

Gnaphalieae
Flora of South America